is a Japanese footballer currently playing as a midfielder.

Career statistics

Club

Notes

International

International goals
Scores and results list Japan's goal tally first.

References

2003 births
Living people
Association football people from Hokkaido
Japanese women's footballers
Japan women's international footballers
Women's association football midfielders
Nippon TV Tokyo Verdy Beleza players
Footballers at the 2020 Summer Olympics
Olympic footballers of Japan